Mark James Haslam (born 26 September 1972) is a former New Zealand international cricketer who played in four Test matches and a single One Day International between 1992 and 1995.

Mark Haslam was a slow left-arm orthodox spin bowler who played domestic cricket for Auckland from 1992 to 2001. His best first-class figures were 5 for 25 for Northern Conference against the touring Bangladeshis in 1997-98.

He is now the Assistant Middle School Principal of Kristin School, a private school on the North Shore of Auckland, New Zealand.

References

External links
 

1972 births
Living people
Auckland cricketers
Cricketers from Bury, Greater Manchester
New Zealand cricketers
New Zealand One Day International cricketers
New Zealand Test cricketers
North Island cricketers
New Zealand schoolteachers